The Nokia 8910i is a luxury mobile phone by Nokia announced on 4 November 2002 and released in early 2003. It had a metal titanium casing and a chromium-plated keypad. It was a minor improvement over the Nokia 8910, with a new colour screen (CSTN 4096 colours) and MMS capability. Both were succeeded by Nokia 8800.
It is Nokia's only feature phone to include both a buzzer and a color display.

References

Mobile phones introduced in 2003
8910i